Masanobu Goshu is a retired Japanese kickboxer. He is a former Krush Super Featherweight champion.

Biography and career

Early life
Goshu was born with hearing loss. He started to play baseball in elementary school and dreamed of becoming a professional, he played for the Tokai University Fuzoku Kofu Senior High School team and participated to the 2004 summer Koshien tournament. He started kickboxing after high school. At 21 he moved to Tokyo and joined PHOENIX GYM with the ambition of becoming professional.
He won the 2011 All Japan KAMINARIMON -65kg title as a part of the RISE organization amateur program.

RISE career
Goshu turned professional under the ring name "Riki Goshu" at RISE 85 on November 23, 2011 where he defeated Shuto Miyazaki by unanimous decision.

On March 11, 2012 Goshu appeared in the first round of the 2012 RISE Rising Rookies Cup at RISE ZERO. He defeated Takeo by unanimous decision to qualify for the Cup final. The final of the Rookies Cup happened on October 25, 2012 at RISE 90 where he defeated Kaido by unanimous decision.

On June 9, 2013 Goshu faced KING at RISE 93. He won the fight by majority decision.

On September 13, 2013 Goshu faced TASUKU at RISE 95. He won the fight by majority decision.

On November 4, 2013 Goshu faced Yuma Yamaguchi at RISE 96. He won the fight by knockout in the second round after flooring his opponent three times.

Goshu challenged Kosuke Komiyama for his RISE Super Featherweight title at RISE 97. He lost the fight by majority decision.

On July 14, 2014 Goshu faced Tatsuya Inaishi at RISE 100 -BLADE 0-. He won the fight by majority decision.

On December 29, 2014 Goshu faced SHIGERU in the first round of the BLADE FC Japan -61kg Tournament at BLADE 1. He lost the fight by knockout in the third round.

On March 21, 2015 Goshu defeated Sho Ogawa by unanimous decision at RISE 104.

On July 12, 2015 Goshu challenged Hikaru Machida for his REBELS -60kg title. He lost by unanimous decision after five rounds.

Goshu faced Kodai Nobe on October 12, 2015 at RISE 107 in a fight serving as the semi final for the vacant super feather weight championship tournament. He lost the fight by majority decision.

K-1 and Krush career
In early 2016 Goshu changed gym and joined the K-1 organization. He made his promotional debut on April 24, 2016 at K-1 World GP 2016 -60kg Japan Tournament in a tournament reserve fight where he faced Shota Kanbe. He lost the fight by extension round split decision.

On December 18, 2016 Goshu engaged in a tournament for the vacant Krush Super Featherweight championship. In the first round He defeated Yoshiki Harada at Krush 71 by knockout. In the quarter final happening on Krush 73 he defeated Takeshi Watanabe by unanimous decision.

He faced Riku Anpo in the semi final of the tournament at Krush 75 on April 2, 2017. He lost the fight by unanimous decision.

On May 28, 2017 Goshu faced Toshi in the semi final of a tournament for the super featherweight championship challenger position at Krush 76. He won the fight by knockout in the third round.

On August 6, 2017 he defeated Fumiya Osawa by unanimous decision at Krush 78 and became the official Super Featherweight championship challenger.

On October 1, 2017 he rematched Riku Anpo for his Krush Super Featherweight title. He won the fight by split decision.

On March 21, 2018 Goshu engaged in the 2018 K-1 Worldg GP -60kg World Tournament at K-1 World GP 2018: K'FESTA.1. In the quarter finals he faced Denis Wosik who he defeated by majority decision. Advancing to the semifinals, he faced Takeru. He lost the fight by knockout, two and half minutes into the first round, after receiving a right straight off of a step-up knee feint. Goshu was unable to beat the eight-count.

Goshu made his first defense of the Krush Super Featherweight title at Krush 89 against Kotaro Shimano. He lost the fight by unanimous decision.

On September 24, 2018 Goshu faced Suarek Rukkukamui at K-1 World GP 2018: inaugural Cruiserweight Championship Tournament. He lost the fight by unanimous decision.

Goshu rebounded from his three fights losing streak when he defeated Naoki Yamamoto by extension round unanimous decision at Krush 96 on December 16, 2018.

On March 10, 2019 Goshu faced Kosuke Komiyama at K-1 World GP 2019: K’FESTA 2. He lost the fight by unanimous decision.

On May 18, 2019 Goshu was faced Yutaka at Krush 101, he was defeated by unanimous decision. Following this loss Goshu distanced himself from kickboxing and later chose to retire due to the COVID-19 pandemic induced break and the birth of his first child.

On July 7, 2022 the K-1 producer announced that Goshu's retirement ceremony would be held at Krush 140 on August 27, 2022.

Titles and accomplishments

Professional
Krush
 2017 Krush Super Featherweight Champion

RISE
 2012 Rising Rookies Cup Super Featherweight Winner

Amateur
RISE
 2011 KAMINARIMON All Japan -65kg Champion & Event MVP 

Awards
efight.jp
 Fighter of the Month (October 2017)

Kickboxing record

|- align="center"  bgcolor="#fbb"
| 2019-05-18 || Loss || align=left| Yutaka || Krush 101 || Tokyo, Japan  || Decision (Unanimous) || 3 || 3:00

|- align="center"  bgcolor="#fbb"
| 2019-03-10 || Loss || align=left| Kosuke Komiyama || K-1 World GP 2019: K’FESTA 2 || Saitama, Japan  || Decision (Unanimous) || 3 || 3:00

|-  style="text-align:center; background:#cfc;"
| 2018-12-16|| Win ||align=left| Naoki Yamamoto || Krush.96 || Tokyo, Japan || Ext.R Decision (Unanimous) || 4|| 3:00 

|-  style="background:#fbb;"
| 2018-09-24 || Loss || align=left| Suarek Rukkukamui || K-1 World GP 2018: inaugural Cruiserweight Championship Tournament || Saitama, Japan || Decision (Unanimous) || 3 || 3:00

|-  style="background:#fbb;"
| 2018-06-30|| Loss||align=left| Kotaro Shimano || Krush.89 || Tokyo, Japan || Decision (Unanimous)|| 3 || 3:00
|-
! style=background:white colspan=9 |

|-  bgcolor="#fbb"
| 2018-03-21 || Loss || align=left| Takeru|| K-1 World GP 2018: K'FESTA.1 -60 kg World Tournament, Semi Finals || Saitama, Japan || KO (Punches) || 1 || 2:25

|-  bgcolor="#cfc"
| 2018-03-21 || Win || align=left| Denis Wosik || K-1 World GP 2018: K'FESTA.1 -60 kg World Tournament, Quarter Finals || Saitama, Japan || Decision (Majority) || 3 || 3:00

|-  style="background:#cfc;"
| 2017-10-01|| Win ||align=left| Riku Anpo|| Krush.81 || Tokyo, Japan || Decision (Split) || 3 || 3:00
|-
! style=background:white colspan=9 |

|-  style="background:#cfc;"
| 2017-08-06 || Win || align=left| Fumiya Osawa || Krush 78 || Tokyo, Japan || Decision (Unanimous) || 3 || 3:00

|-  style="background:#cfc;"
| 2017-05-28 || Win || align=left| Toshi || Krush 76 || Tokyo, Japan || KO (Knee to the body) || 3 || 2:08

|-  style="background:#fbb;"
| 2017-04-02|| Loss ||align=left| Riku Anpo || Krush.75 - Super Featherweight Championship Tournament Semi Final || Tokyo, Japan || Decision (Unanimous) || 3 || 3:00

|-  style="background:#cfc;"
| 2017-02-18 || Win || align=left| Takeshi Watanabe|| Krush 73 - Super Featherweight Championship Tournament Quarter Final || Tokyo, Japan || Decision (Unanimous) || 3 || 3:00

|-  style="background:#cfc;"
| 2016-12-18 || Win || align=left| Yoshiki Harada|| Krush 71 || Tokyo, Japan || TKO (3 knockdowns) || 3 || 1:10

|-  style="text-align:center; background:#fbb;"
| 2016-04-24 || Loss || align=left| Shota Kanbe || K-1 World GP 2016 -60kg Japan Tournament || Tokyo, Japan || Ext.R Decision (Split)|| 4 || 3:00

|-  style="background:#cfc;"
| 2016-01-31 || Win || align=left| Kazuma || RISE 109 || Tokyo, Japan || Decision (Unanimous) || 3 || 3:00

|-  style="text-align:center; background:#fbb;"
| 2015-10-12 || Loss || align=left| Kodai Nobe || RISE 107 - Super Featherweight Championship Tournament Semi Final || Tokyo, Japan || Decision (Majority)|| 3 || 3:00

|-  style="text-align:center; background:#fbb;"
| 2015-07-12 || Loss || align=left| Hikaru Machida || REBELS 37 || Tokyo, Japan || Decision (Unanimous)|| 5 || 3:00
|-
! style=background:white colspan=9 |

|-  style="background:#cfc;"
| 2015-05-31 || Win || align=left| Fumihiro Uesugi|| RISE 105  || Tokyo, Japan || Ext.R Decision (Split) || 4 || 3:00

|-  style="background:#cfc;"
| 2015-03-21 || Win || align=left| Sho Ogawa|| RISE 104  || Tokyo, Japan || Decision (Unanimous) || 3 || 3:00

|-  style="background:#fbb;"
| 2014-12-29 || Loss || align=left| SHIGERU|| BLADE 1 - BLADE FC Japan -61kg Tournament Quarter Finals  || Tokyo, Japan || KO (Flying knee) || 3 || 2:59

|-  style="background:#cfc;"
| 2014-09-28 || Win || align=left| Yusuke Nogami|| RISE 101  || Tokyo, Japan || TKO (Corner stoppage) || 2 || 0:21

|-  style="background:#cfc;"
| 2014-07-12 || Win || align=left| Tatsuya Inaishi|| RISE 100 ～BLADE 0～ || Tokyo, Japan || Decision (Majority) || 3 || 3:00

|-  style="background:#cfc;"
| 2014-04-29 || Win || align=left| Scorpion|| RISE 99|| Tokyo, Japan || TKO (Referee stoppage) || 2 || 2:47

|-  style="text-align:center; background:#fbb;"
| 2014-01-25 || Loss || align=left| Kosuke Komiyama || RISE 97 || Tokyo, Japan || Decision (Majority)|| 5 || 3:00
|-
! style=background:white colspan=9 |

|-  style="background:#cfc;"
| 2013-11-04 || Win || align=left| Yuma Yamaguchi || RISE 96|| Tokyo, Japan || TKO (3 knockdowns) || 2 || 0:56

|-  style="background:#cfc;"
| 2013-09-13 || Win || align=left| TASUKU || RISE 95|| Tokyo, Japan || Decision (Majority) || 3 || 3:00

|-  style="background:#cfc;"
| 2013-06-09 || Win || align=left| KING || RISE 93|| Tokyo, Japan || Decision (Majority) || 3 || 3:00

|-  style="background:#cfc;"
| 2013-04-14 || Win || align=left| Fumiya Sasaki|| RISE ZERO  || Tokyo, Japan || Decision (Unanimous) || 3 || 3:00

|-  style="background:#cfc;"
| 2013-02-03 || Win || align=left| Shinichi Ishii|| RISE ZERO  || Tokyo, Japan || Ext.R Decision (Unanimous) || 4 || 3:00

|-  style="background:#cfc;"
| 2012-10-25 || Win || align=left| Kaido || RISE 90 - Rising Rookies Cup Final|| Tokyo, Japan || Decision (Unanimous) || 3 || 3:00
|-
! style=background:white colspan=9 |

|-  style="background:#cfc;"
| 2012-06-02 || Win || align=left| Genki || RISE 88|| Tokyo, Japan || TKO || 2 || 1:24

|-  style="background:#cfc;"
| 2012-03-11 || Win || align=left| Takeo|| RISE ZERO - Rising Rookies Cup Semi Final || Tokyo, Japan || Decision (Unanimous) || 3 || 3:00

|-  style="background:#cfc;"
| 2012-01-28 || Win || align=left| Akito || RISE 86 || Tokyo, Japan || TKO (Referee stoppage) || 3 || 1:24

|-  style="background:#cfc;"
| 2011-11-23 || Win || align=left| Shuto Miyazaki || RISE 85 || Tokyo, Japan || Decision (Unanimous) || 3 || 3:00

|-
| colspan=9 | Legend:    

|-  style="text-align:center; background:#cfc;"
| 2011-09-18 || Win || align=left| Daiki Kaneko || KAMINARIMON All Japan, Final || Tokyo, Japan || Decision (Unanimous)|| 1 || 3:00
|-
! style=background:white colspan=9 |

|-  style="text-align:center; background:#cfc;"
| 2011-09-18 || Win || align=left|  || KAMINARIMON All Japan, Semi Final || Tokyo, Japan || Decision (Unanimous)|| 1 || 2:00

|-  style="text-align:center; background:#cfc;"
| 2011-04-17 || Win || align=left| Issei Murate || KAMINARIMON || Tokyo, Japan || Decision (Unanimous)|| 2 || 1:30

|-  style="text-align:center; background:#cfc;"
| 2010-10-31 || Win || align=left| Osamu Nakamoto || KAMINARIMON || Tokyo, Japan || Decision (Unanimous)|| 2 || 1:30

|-  style="text-align:center; background:#cfc;"
| 2010-05-30 || Win || align=left| Aito Matsumoto || KAMINARIMON || Tokyo, Japan || Decision (Unanimous)|| 2 || 1:30

|-  style="text-align:center; background:#cfc;"
| 2010-04-25 || Win || align=left| Keisuke Taguchi || KAMINARIMON || Tokyo, Japan || Decision (Unanimous)|| 2 || 1:30

|-
| colspan=9 | Legend:

References

Living people
1986 births
Japanese male kickboxers
Deaf martial artists